Wallas may refer to:
 Graham Wallas (1858–1932), English socialist
 Katharine Wallas (1864–1944), British politician
 Wallas Eaton (1917–1995), English actor
 Wallas, a brand of diesel or paraffin oil operated boat or summer cottage space heaters, stoves and ovens from Wallas-Marin Oy.

See also
Walla